Tetrablemma is a widespread genus of armored spiders first described by Octavius Pickard-Cambridge in 1873. It only has four eyes; an unusual trait for spiders, found only here and in some species of Caponiidae, though the two are not closely related. The eyes are large, but unequal in size, closely grouped around the center of the prosoma that rises in a somewhat of a cone shape from the abdomen. They have four closely positioned spinnerets enclosed in a corneous casing.

Species
, the World Spider Catalog accepted the following species:

Tetrablemma alaus Burger, Harvey & Stevens, 2010 – Australia (Western Australia)
Tetrablemma alterum Roewer, 1963 – Micronesia
Tetrablemma benoiti (Brignoli, 1978) – Seychelles
Tetrablemma brevidens Tong & Li, 2008 – China
Tetrablemma brignolii Lehtinen, 1981 – India
Tetrablemma deccanense (Tikader, 1976) – India
Tetrablemma extorre Shear, 1978 – Trinidad
Tetrablemma helenense Benoit, 1977 – St. Helena
Tetrablemma kepense Lin, Li & Jäger, 2018 – Cambodia
Tetrablemma loebli Bourne, 1980 – India
Tetrablemma magister Burger, 2008 – Australia (Queensland)
Tetrablemma manggarai Lehtinen, 1981 – Indonesia (Flores)
Tetrablemma marawula Lehtinen, 1981 – Indonesia (Sulawesi)
Tetrablemma mardionoi Lehtinen, 1981 – Indonesia (Sumatra)
Tetrablemma medioculatum O. Pickard-Cambridge, 1873 (type species) – Sri Lanka
Tetrablemma menglaense Lin & Li, 2014 – China
Tetrablemma namkhan Lin, Li & Jäger, 2012 – Laos
Tetrablemma nandan Lin & Li, 2010 – China
Tetrablemma okei Butler, 1932 – Australia (Victoria)
Tetrablemma phulchoki Lehtinen, 1981 – Nepal
Tetrablemma rhinoceros (Brignoli, 1974) – Angola
Tetrablemma samoense Marples, 1964 – Samoa
Tetrablemma sokense Lin, Li & Jäger, 2018 – Cambodia
Tetrablemma thamin Labarque & Grismado, 2009 – Myanmar
Tetrablemma viduum (Brignoli, 1974) – Angola
Tetrablemma vietnamense Lehtinen, 1981 – Vietnam
Tetrablemma ziyaoense Lin & Li, 2014 – China

References

Tetrablemmidae
Araneomorphae genera
Spiders of Asia
Spiders of Africa
Spiders of the Caribbean